Grégory Wathelet (born 10 September 1980) is a Belgian equestrian who competes in the sport of show jumping.

At the 2012 Summer Olympics in London, he was a member of the Belgian team in the team jumping competition which his team, composed of Le Jeune, Demeersman and Lansink, finished in thirteenth place. At the 2020 Summer Olympics in Tokyo, having finished 9th in the Individual jumping, he was a member of the Belgian team in the team jumping competition which his team, composed of Devos and Guery, finished in third place, giving Belgium its first equestrian medal since the 1976 Summer Olympics. He was the Belgian flag bearer in the closing ceremony of the 2020 Summer Olympics.

International Championship Results

References

External links
 
 
 
 
 
 
 

1980 births
Living people
Equestrians at the 2012 Summer Olympics
Belgian show jumping riders
Olympic equestrians of Belgium
Belgian male equestrians
Equestrians at the 2020 Summer Olympics
Olympic medalists in equestrian
Medalists at the 2020 Summer Olympics
Olympic bronze medalists for Belgium
People from Huy
Sportspeople from Liège Province